Paweł Wojowski (born 27 August 1994) is a Polish professional footballer who plays as a left midfielder for Radunia Stężyca.

Career

Radunia Stężyca
Wojowski joined Radunia Stężyca on 4 February 2019.

References

External links
 
 

Polish footballers
Living people
1994 births
Poland youth international footballers
Ekstraklasa players
I liga players
II liga players
III liga players
Arka Gdynia players
Gryf Wejherowo players
OKS Stomil Olsztyn players
ŁKS Łódź players
People from Kartuzy
Association football midfielders